In the mathematical field of geometric topology, the simplicial volume (also called Gromov norm) is a certain measure of the topological complexity of a manifold. More generally, the simplicial norm measures the complexity of homology classes.

Given a closed and oriented manifold, one defines the simplicial norm by minimizing the sum of the absolute values of the coefficients over all singular chains representing a cycle. The simplicial volume is the simplicial norm of the fundamental class.

It is named after Mikhail Gromov, who introduced it in 1982. With William Thurston, he proved that the simplicial volume of a finite volume hyperbolic manifold is proportional to the hyperbolic volume.

The simplicial volume is equal to twice the Thurston norm

Thurston also used the simplicial volume to prove that hyperbolic volume decreases under hyperbolic Dehn surgery.

References

 Michael Gromov. Volume and bounded cohomology.  Inst. Hautes Études Sci. Publ. Math. 56 (1982), 5–99.

External links 
Simplicial volume at the Manifold Atlas.

Homology theory
Norms (mathematics)